Reginald Horkings (20 June 1919 – 18 May 2007) was an Australian rules footballer who played with Hawthorn in the Victorian Football League (VFL).

Notes

External links 

Reg Horkings's playing statistics from The VFA Project

1919 births
2007 deaths
Australian rules footballers from Melbourne
Hawthorn Football Club players
Camberwell Football Club players
People from Carlton, Victoria